Now Deh (also Romanized as Now Deh; also known as Now Deh-e Bālā) is a village in Tus Rural District, in the Central District of Mashhad County, Razavi Khorasan Province, Iran. At the 2006 census, its population was 20,771, in 5,244 families.

References 

Populated places in Mashhad County